Many copper mines have existed in the Copper Country of the U.S. state of Michigan. These include both large-scale commercial ventures and small operations. There are hundreds of ancient mining pits in and around the Copper Country area, especially on Isle Royale (several of these were developed). Numerous small modern diggings exist around the area as well, including some around Fort Wilkins and the Copper Harbor Light.

Mines
 543-S - near Gratiot Lake, Keweenaw County
 543-S Deposit - near Deer Lake, Keweenaw County
 Adventure mine - Greenland
 Aetna Exploration Copper mine - Keweenaw County
 Aetna mine - Keweenaw County
 Agate Harbor mine - Agate Harbor, Keweenaw County
 Agency mine - Keweenaw County
 Ahmeek mine - Ahmeek, Keweenaw County
 Albion mine (originally the Manhattan Mine) - Keweenaw County
 Algomah mine - Mass City, Ontonagon County
 Allouez mine - Allouez, Keweenaw County
 American Mining, Exploring, & Manufacturing Company mine - Isle Royale, Keweenaw County 
 Amygdaloid and Isle Royale mine - Amygdaloid Island, Isle Royale, Keweenaw County
 Amygdaloid mine - Delaware, Keweenaw County
 Arcadian mine - Ripley, Houghton County
 Arctic mine - Victoria, Ontonagon County
 Arnold mine - Copper Falls, Keweenaw County
 Ashbed mine - Copper Falls, Keweenaw County
 Atlantic Mine - Atlantic Mine, Houghton County
 Atlantic Section 16 Exploration Prospect - Baltic
 Baltic mine - Baltic
 Baltic mine - South Range, Houghton County
 Bay State Fissure mine - Phoenix, Keweenaw County
 Belt mine (originally the Piscatauqua mine) - Mass City, Ontonagon County
 Bluff Wyoming mine - Mandan, Keweenaw County
 Bohemian Range Exploration - Keweenaw County
 Boston and North American Silver prospect - Silver City, Ontonagon County
 Boston mine - Boston location, Houghton County
 Brooklyn mine (originally the Nahass mine) - Victoria, Ontonagon County
 Bumblebee mine - Rockland, Ontonagon County
 Butler mine - Mass City, Ontonagon County
 Caledonia mine - Mass City, Ontonagon County
 Calumet and Hecla mines
 Cape mine - within the Mosquito District of Copper Harbor, Keweenaw County
 Carp Lake mine - Porcupine Mountains, Ontonagon County
 Cascade prospect - Matchwood Township, Ontonagon County
 Centennial mine - Centennial Heights, Houghton County; Calumet, Houghton County; and Kearsarge, Houghton County
 Central Exploration - Central, Keweenaw County
 Central mine - Central, Keweenaw County
 Challenge Copper mine - Toivola, Houghton County
 Champion mine - Painesdale, Houghton County
 Chippewa Mining Company Exploration - Ontonagon County
 Cherokee mine - Twin Lakes, Houghton County
 Chicago and Isle Royale mine - on the northwest shore of Isle Royale National Park
 Clark mine - near Copper Harbor, Keweenaw County
 Cliff mine - abandoned Clifton, Keweenaw County; operated from 1845 to 1878
 Avery shaft 
 Clifton mine - Norwich, Ontonagon County 
 Concord and Douglas Copper Mine - Houghton County
 Concord mine - Ripley, Houghton County 
 Connecticut mine - Delaware, Keweenaw County
 Copper Falls mine - Copper Falls, Keweenaw County
 Childs Fissure Mine
 Copper Falls Fissure Mine 
 Hill Fissure Mine 
 Old Copper Falls Fissure Mine 
 Owl Creek Fissure Mine
 Cuyahoga mine - Porcupine Mountains, Ontonagon County
 Delevan mine - Porcupine Mountains, Ontonagon County
 Derby mine - Norwich, Ontonagon County
 G-12 Prospect - Lac La Belle, Keweenaw County
 G-13 Prospect - Lac La Belle, Keweenaw County
 Garden City mine - Phoenix, Keweenaw County
 Girard Exploration - Keweenaw County
 Girard Mining Company mine - Keweenaw County
 Globe mine - Painesdale, Houghton County
 Gogebic mine - Bergland, Ontonagon County
 Gratiot Lake Project Prospect - Gratiot Lake, Keweenaw County
 Gratiot Copper mine - Gratiot location, Keweenaw County
 Dana mine - Central
 Datolite mine - Isle Royale, Keweenaw County 
 Delaware mine - the abandoned town of Delaware, Keweenaw County, twelve miles south of Copper Harbor
 Delaware Fissure mine
 Dover mine - Dover location
 Dorchester Mining Company mine - Houghton County
 Drexel mine - Delaware, Keweenaw County
 Duncan's location - near Duncan Bay on Isle Royale National Park
 Eagle Exploration prospect - Twin Lakes, Houghton County
 Eagle Harbor mines - Eagle Harbor, Keweenaw County
 Eagle mine - under construction since 2010 near Yellow Dog Plains
 Eagle River mine - Phoenix, Keweenaw County
 Elm River mine - Twin Lakes, Houghton County
 Epidote mine - Isle Royale, Keweenaw County
 Erie-Ontario Mine - Donken, Houghton County
 Evergreen Bluff mine - Mass City, Ontonagon County
 Flintsteel mine (formerly known as the Nassau mine, Old Flintsteel mine, and the Superior-Nassau Superior mine) - Mass City, Ontonagon County
 Florida mine - Florida location, Houghton County
 Franklin mine - Franklin; bought by the Quincy Mining Company in 1908
 Franklin Jr. mine (originally the Albany and Boston mine; then the Peninsula mine) - Ripley, Houghton County
 Halliwell mine - Porcupine Mountains, Ontonagon County
 Hancock mine - Hancock, Houghton County
 Dupuis shaft
 Hanover mine - Copper Harbor, Keweenaw County
 Hays mine (originally the Pittsburg and Boston mine) - Copper Harbor, Keweenaw County
 Haytown mine (originally the Pittsburg and Isle Royale mine) - Haytown, Isle Royale, Keweenaw County
 Hecla mine - Hecla location, Houghton County
 Hilton mine (originally the Ohio mine) - Greenland
 Hogan mine - Delaware, Keweenaw County
 Houghton Exploration prospect - Superior
 Hudson mine (originally the Eureka mine) - Norwich, Ontonagon County
 Humboldt mine - Copper Falls, Keweenaw County
 Huron mine (originally the Houghton mine) - Hurontown, Houghton County
 Iron City mine (originally the Empire Mine) - within the Mosquito District of Copper Harbor, Keweenaw County
 Iroquois mine - Mohawk, Keweenaw County
 Island mine - Isle Royale, Keweenaw County
 Isle Royale and Chicago mine - Isle Royale, Keweenaw County
 Isle Royale mine - south of Houghton, Houghton County
 Kearsarge mine - Kearsarge
 King Philip mine - Winona, Houghton County
 Kingston mine - Copper City
 Knowlton mine - Mass City, Ontonagon County
 La Salle mine - Osceola, Houghton County
 Lac La Belle Exploration - Keweenaw County
 Lafayette mine - Porcupine Mountains, Ontonagon County
 Lake mine - Mass City, Ontonagon County
 Lake Superior mine - Ontonagon County
 Laurium mine - Laurium, Houghton County
 Lizzardo mine - Keweenaw County
 Lucky Bay mine - Isle Royale, Keweenaw County
 Mabbs mine - Houghton, Houghton County
 Madison mine - Central
 Mandan mine - Mandan, Keweenaw County
 Manganese mine - the abandoned town of Manganese, outside of Copper Harbor, near the Clark mine
 Manhattan Exploration Prospect - Ojibway, Keweenaw County
 Manitou Copper mine - near Torch Lake, Houghton County
 Mass Consolidated mine - Mass City, Ontonagon County
 Hazard mine
 Mass mine
 Merrimac mine
 Ogima mine
 Ridge mine
 Massachusetts Copper-Land and Mining Company mine
 Mayflower Old Colony Mine - Centennial
 Meadow mine - Phoenix, Keweenaw County
 Medore mine - Mandan, Keweenaw County
 Mendenhall mine - Victoria, Ontonagon County
 Mendota mine - Lac La Belle, Keweenaw County
 Merryweather prospect - Bergland, Ontonagon County
 Mesnard mine - Hancock, Houghton County; bought by the Quincy Mining Company in 1897
 Mica Schist Drill Sample Prospect - Tapiola, Houghton County
 Michigan mine - Rockland, Ontonagon County
 Michigan Technological University Experimental mine - Pewabic
 Minesota Mine - Rockland, Ontonagon County
 Minong mine - Isle Royale, Keweenaw County
 Miskwabic Exploration Prospect - Phoenix, Keweenaw County
 Mohawk mine - Mohawk, Keweenaw County
 Montezuma Prospect - Houghton, Houghton County
 Mott Island mines - Mott Island, Isle Royale, Keweenaw County
 Mount Bohemia mine - Mount Bohemia, Keweenaw County
 Natick Gap Exploration Prospect - Phoenix, Keweenaw County, or Vaughsville, Keweenaw County (sources disagree)
 National mine - Rockland, Ontonagon County
 Native Copper mine - Delaware, Keweenaw County
 Naumkeag mine - Houghton, Houghton County
 Nebraska mine - Mass City, Ontonagon County
 New Arcadian Exploration - Ripley, Houghton County
 New Baltic Copper Company mine - Wolverine
 New Baltic Exploration prospect - Houghton County
 New York and Michigan Exploration mine - Keweenaw County
 North's Copper Pit - Houghton County
 North American Mine - Phoenix, Keweenaw County
 North Cliff Mine - Keweenaw County
 North Kearsarge mine - Kearsarge and Ahmeek
 North Lake Mine - Ontonagon County
 Northwestern mine - Central
 Nonesuch mine - White Pine, Ontonagon County; operated from 1867 to 1912
 Ohio and Isle Royale mine - Isle Royale, Keweenaw County
 Ohio Trap Rock mine - Norwich, Ontonagon County
 Ojibway mine - Ojibway, Keweenaw County
 Old Colony Exploration Prospect - Calumet, Houghton County
 Old Mass mine - Ontonagon County
 Old Mendota Copper mine - Lac La Belle, Keweenaw County
 Oneco Exploration prospect - Hubbell, Houghton County
 Oneida mine - Victoria, Ontonagon County
 Ontonagon mine - Rockland, Ontonagon County
 Ontonagon mine - Victoria, Ontonagon County
 Ontonagon Silver mine - Silver City, Ontonagon County
 Osceola Mine - Osceola, Houghton County
 Outer Hill Island mine - Isle Royale, Keweenaw County
 Pacific Exploration prospect - Atlantic Mine, Houghton County
 Painesdale mine - Painesdale, Houghton County
 Peninsula mine - Ontonagon County
 Pennsylvania Copper Mine - Delaware, Keweenaw County
 Petherick mine - Keweenaw County 
 Pewabic mine - Pewabic, Houghton County; one shaft north of the Quincy Mine; acquired by Quincy in 1891 and renamed to the Quincy #6 shaft
 Phoenix mine - Phoenix, Keweenaw County
 Pit 69 - Isle Royale, Keweenaw County
 Pittsburg mine - Norwich, Ontonagon County
 Pontiac Exploration prospect - Pewabic, Houghton County
 Pontiac mine - bought by the Quincy Mine in 1897
 Porcupine mine - Porcupine Mountains, Ontonagon County
 Portage mine (Originally the Grand Portage mine) - Houghton County
 Quincy Mine - Quincy, Houghton County
 Ransom mine - Isle Royale, Keweenaw County
 Reliance Prospect - Keweenaw County
 Resolute mine - Keweenaw County
 Rhode Island Exploration - Osceola, Houghton County
 Rhode Island mine - Osceola, Houghton County
 Ridge mine - near Mass City, Ontonagon County
 Ripley Exploration Prospect - Ripley, Houghton County
 Robbins Mine - Phoenix, Keweenaw County or Vaughnsville, Keweenaw County (sources disagree)
 Rockland mine - Rockland, Ontonagon Count; opened in 1847
 Saginaw mine - Isle Royale, Keweenaw County
 Saint Mary's mine - St. Mary's location, Houghton County
 Scoville mine - near Scoville Point in Rock Harbor on Isle Royale National Park
 Scranton mine - Silver City, Ontonagon County
 Seneca mine - Seneca location
 Sharon mine - Norwich, Ontonagon County
 Shawmut mine - Twin Lakes, Houghton County
 Shelden-Columbian mine - Houghton, Houghton County
 Columbian mine (originally the Albion mine)
 Sheldon mine
 Siskowit mine - Rock Harbour, Isle Royale, Keweenaw County
 Smithwick mine - Near the end of Rock Harbor within Isle Royale, Keweenaw County
 South Cliff Mine - Phoenix, Keweenaw County
 South Hecla mine - Calumet, Houghton County
 South Kearsarge mine - Centennial
 South Lake mine (originally the Aztec Mine) - Mass City, Ontonagon County
 South Pewabic Copper Company mine
 South Side mine - Houghton County
 St. Clair Mine - Phoenix, Keweenaw County
 St. Louis Mine Exploration - Laurium, Houghton County
 Star mine - Keweenaw County
 Stoutenburgh Mine - Delaware, Keweenaw County
 Suffolk Exploration - Keweenaw County
 Superior mine (originally the Old Superior mine) - Superior
 Tamarack Junior mine - Tamarack
 Tamarack mine - Tamarack
 Third Island mine - Isle Royale, Keweenaw County
 Toltec mine - Mass City, Ontonagon County
 Tremont mine (originally the Devon mine) - Ontonagon County
 Trimountain mine - Trimountain, Houghton County
 Union mine (originally the Bell No. 2 mine) - Porcupine Mountains, Ontonagon County
 United States Exploration Prospect - Ontonagon County
 Vaughnsville Exploration Prospect - Vaughnsville, Keweenaw County
 Victoria Mine (originally the Cushin mine) - Victoria, Ontonagon County; closed in 1921
 Vulcan Exploration Copper mine - Keweenaw County
 Vulcan mine - Ontonagon County
 Washington mine - Mandan, Keweenaw County
 Waterbury mine - Keweenaw County
 Waukulla mine - Bergland, Ontonagon County
 Webster Prospect - Houghton, Houghton County
 Wendigo mine - Wendigo, Isle Royale, Keweenaw County 
 West Caribou Island mine No. 3 - West Caribou Island, Isle Royale, Keweenaw County
 West Minnesota mine - Victoria, Ontonagon County 
 West Vein mine - Phoenix, Keweenaw County 
 Wheal Kate prospect - South Range, Houghton County 
 White Pine mine - White Pine, Ontonagon County; the last mine to close in the Copper Country, in 1995
 Whittlesey mine - Isle Royale, Keweenaw County 
 Winona mine - Winona, Houghton County
 Winthrop mine - Central
 Wolverine Mine - Wolverine
 Wyandot mine - Twin Lakes, Houghton County
 Wyoming mine - Wyoming (Helltown)

Notes 
 There exist a fairly large number of unnamed mines within settlements such as Boston location, Hancock, Houghton, Hurontown, Laurium, Osceola, Oskar, Painesdale, Point Mills, Sevenmile Creek, Superior, Tamarack, Toivola, near Torch Lake, Twin Lakes, and Wolverine in Houghton County; and Copper Falls, Copper Harbor, Isle Royale, near Jacob's Creek, Mandan, Manitou Island, Ojibway, Phoenix, and Vaughsville in Keweenaw County.
 Also not included on this list are the hundreds of prehistoric mining pits that exist throughout the Copper Country.

See also
 Copper mining in Michigan
 List of Copper Country smelters
 List of Copper Country mills
 Lists of copper mines in the United States

Copper Country mines
Copper Country mines